Kelli Hubly (born August 9, 1994) is an American soccer player who plays as a defender for National Women's Soccer League (NWSL) club Portland Thorns FC. With the Thorns, Hubly won the 2017 NWSL Championship, the 2021 NWSL Shield, and other awards.

Early years 
Hubly was born in Elk Grove Village, Illinois and attended Elk Grove High School. Growing up she played for the club Sockers F.C. in Chicago, winning the 2010 and 2011 Illinois Cup Championships and the U.S. Youth Soccer Regional Championship in 2011.

College 
Hubly played at the University of Kentucky her first three years (2012-2014) of college, making the All-Freshman Team of the Southeastern Conference (SEC) in 2012, winning the SEC's Freshman of the Week award on October 15, 2012, and making Top Drawer Soccer's National Team of the Week on October 8, 2013. In 2014 she helped the Wildcats advance to the SEC championship game. In 2015 she transferred to DePaul University, red-shirting that year due to NCAA transfer rules. She played the following year (2016), leading the Big East Conference in assists and assists per game, and graduated in 2017.

Club career 
Hubly was eligible but not drafted in the 2017 NWSL College Draft. Hubly joined the Portland Thorns as a temporary national team replacement player in 2017. Coming on for the last few minutes, Hubly made her first team debut on July 15, 2017, in a 1-0 win over the North Carolina Courage. That fall, she won the 2017 NWSL Championship with the Thorns. She earned her first professional start on March 24, 2018, against the Courage. After playing every minute of the first four games of the 2018 NWSL season due to an injury to usual starter Emily Menges, Hubly was signed by the Thorns on April 27, 2018, to a long-term contract. Hubly was a key member and frequent starter for the Thorns teams that won the 2020 Fall Series (Community Shield), 2021 NWSL Challenge Cup, 2021 Women's International Champions Cup, and 2021 NWSL Shield. In the 2022 NWSL Season, Hubly played in every minute of every game for the Portland Thorns and was included in the 2022 NWSL Best XI Second Team.

International 
Hubly was a member of the U.S. Women's National Team at the U-15, U-17, and U-18 levels.

Honors and awards

College 

 Southeastern Conference All-Freshman Team: 2012

Club
Portland Thorns FC
NWSL Champions: 2017, 2022
NWSL Shield: 2021
 NWSL Challenge Cup: 2021
 NWSL Community Shield: 2020
 Women's International Champions Cup: 2021

Individual
 NWSL Second XI: 2022

References

External links

1994 births
Living people
American women's soccer players
DePaul Blue Demons women's soccer players
Kentucky Wildcats women's soccer players
National Women's Soccer League players
People from Elk Grove Village, Illinois
Portland Thorns FC players
Soccer players from Illinois
Sportspeople from Cook County, Illinois
Sportspeople from DuPage County, Illinois
Women's association football defenders